The 58th Hong Kong Macau Interport was held in Macau on 21 April 2002. Both Hong Kong and Macau sent their Olympic teams.  Hong Kong captured the champion by winning 2-0.

Results

References

Hong Kong–Macau Interport
Macau
Hong